Kerem Kalafat (born 9 March 2001) is a Turkish professional footballer who plays as a right back for TFF First League club Çaykur Rizespor on loan from Beşiktaş.

Career
Kalafat made his professional debut with Beşiktaş in a 4–0 UEFA Europa League loss to Wolverhampton Wanderers on 12 December 2019. In July 2021, Beşiktaş loanded Kalafat out TFF Second League outfit Uşakspor for 2021–22 season. On 13 January 2022, Beşiktaş used the call-back option of Kalafat while his loan stint at Uşakspor and he rejoined the team. He was then loaned to Çaykur Rizespor for the following season.

References

External links
 
 

2001 births
Living people
People from Şişli
Footballers from Istanbul
Turkish footballers
Turkey youth international footballers
Association football fullbacks
Beşiktaş J.K. footballers
Giresunspor footballers
Uşakspor footballers
Çaykur Rizespor footballers
Süper Lig players
TFF First League players
TFF Second League players